Vincent Marshall Gavre (April 5, 1914 – December 25, 2006) was an American football player and coach. He served as the head football coach at Western State College of Colorado—now known as Western Colorado University—in Gunnison, Colorado from 1948 to 1949, compiling a record of 11–7.

Head coaching record

References

1914 births
2006 deaths
American football quarterbacks
Wisconsin Badgers football coaches
Wisconsin Badgers football players
Western Colorado Mountaineers football coaches
People from Wood County, Wisconsin
Players of American football from Wisconsin